Yi Chun (Hangul: 이춘, Hanja: 李椿; ? - 24 July 1342) or Yi Seon-Rae (Hangul: 이선래, Hanja: 李善來), his Mongolian name was Bayan Temür (Hangul: 바얀테무르, Hanja: 孛顔帖木兒, Mongolian script: Баян төмөр; Pai-yen tö-mör) was the father of Hwanjo of Joseon and the biological grandfather of Taejo of Joseon, the founder of the Joseon Dynasty in Korea. After his death, he was given the temple name Dojo (도조, 度祖) by his great-grandson, King Taejong.

From Yuan dynasty, he replaced his father, Yi Haeng-ni (이행리) as a Cheonho (천호, 千戶). He later married Lady Munju Bak (문주 박씨; the future Queen Gyeongsun) and had 2 sons, they were: Yi Ja-heung (이자흥) and Yi Jachun (이자춘), the biological father of Yi Seong-Gye (이성계). After Bak's death, Yi remarried again with Lady Jo (조씨), the daughter of Jo Yang-gi (조양기). In 28 July 1392, his grandson, Yi Seong-Gye (이성계) founded the Joseon dynasty and he posthumously honoured his grandfather as King Gonguiseongdo the Great (공의성도대왕, 恭毅聖度大王) and gave him the temple name Dojo (도조, 度祖). He was buried in Uireung, Hamheung-si, Hamgyeongnam-do and his wife was buried in Sulleung, Heungnam-si, Hamgyeongnam-do.

Family
Father: Ikjo of Joseon (조선 익조)
Grandfather: Mokjo of Joseon (조선 목조)
Grandmother: Queen Hyogong of the Pyeonchang Yi clan (효공왕후 이씨)
Mother: Queen Jeongsuk of the Yeongheung Choi clan (정숙왕후 최씨)
Grandfather: Choi Gi-yeol, Prince Anbyeon (최기열 안변군)
Wives and their Children(s):
Queen Gyeongsun of the Munju Bak clan (경순왕후 박씨)
Yi Ja-heung, Grand Prince Wanchang (이자흥 완창대군)
Yi Ja-chun (이자춘)
Lady Jo, of the Hanyan Jo clan (한양 조씨)
Yi Ja-seon, Grand Prince Wanwon (이자선 완원대군)
Yi Pyeong, Grand Prince Wancheon (이평 완천대군)
Yi Jong, Grand Prince Wanseong (이종 완성대군)
Princess Munhye (문혜공주) – married Mun In-yeong (문인영).
Princess Munsuk (문숙공주) – married Gim Ma-bun (김마분).
Princess Munui (문의공주) – married Heo-Jung (허중).

References

14th-century Korean people
House of Yi
Year of birth unknown
Date of birth unknown
1342 deaths